Edgar Dyson (16 October 1883 – 23 February 1937) was a British gymnast. He competed in the men's artistic individual all-around event at the 1908 Summer Olympics.

References

1883 births
1937 deaths
British male artistic gymnasts
Olympic gymnasts of Great Britain
Gymnasts at the 1908 Summer Olympics
Sportspeople from Halifax, West Yorkshire